Henry LeTang (June 19, 1915April 26, 2007) was an American theatre,
film, and television choreographer and a dance instructor.

Biography
Born in the Harlem neighbourhood of Manhattan, LeTang was the second son of Clarence, born in Dominica, and his wife Marie, who emigrated from St. Croix. The couple owned and operated a radio and phonograph repair shop. All their children were musically inclined; in addition to his interest in dance, LeTang played the violin. At the age of seventeen, he opened his first studio, one small room with a piano. Over the ensuing decades he taught and/or worked with a multitude of entertainment personalities, including Lena Horne, Betty Hutton, Billie Holiday, Eleanor Powell, Lola Falana, Peter Gennaro, Leslie Uggams, Joey Heatherton, Chita Rivera, Ben Vereen, Debbie Allen, Hinton Battle, Savion Glover, and the Hines brothers, Maurice and Gregory.

LeTang devised dance routines for the Broadway musicals My Dear Public and Dream with Music in the mid-1940s, but his first credit as a full-fledged choreographer was the 1952 revival of the 1921 revue Shuffle Along with Eubie Blake. Twenty-six years later, LeTang would receive Tony and Drama Desk Award nominations for his work on Eubie!, a song-and-dance tribute to the musician. Additional credits include Sophisticated Ladies (1981), which earned him a second Tony nomination, and Black and Blue (1989), which finally won him the prize. LeTang was also inducted into the "International Tap Dance Hall of Fame" in 2015 

LeTang's screen credits include Francis Ford Coppola's The Cotton Club (1984) and Tap (1989). For television he choreographed The Garry Moore Show for seven years, staged the Jerry Lewis MDA Telethon numerous times, and created dance routines for George Balanchine and Milton Berle. His last project was the Showtime bio-film Bojangles in 2001.

The Oklahoma City University Ann Lacy School of American Dance and Arts Management Ann Lacy School of Dance and Entertainment - Oklahoma City University, headed by Dean John Bedford and dance department chairman Jo Rowan, presented LeTang with a Living Treasure in American Dance Award in 1995 and with an Honorary Doctor of Performing Arts in American Dance degree in 2002. In the years prior to his death, he resided in Las Vegas, Nevada, teaching master classes from his home studio and travelling several times a year to hold classes in New York City. Henry LeTang also lived in Airmont (Monsey), New York, in the 1980s and 1990s.
He died of natural causes in Las Vegas, Nevada, at the age of 91.

References

External links
 Terry Monaghan, Henry LeTang obituary, The Guardian, May 9, 2007.
 Margalit Fox, "Henry LeTang, Master of Tap, Dies at 91", The New York Times, May 3, 2007.
 Mary Rourke, "Henry LeTang, 91; Tony Award-winning choreographer and tap dance teacher", Los Angeles Times, May 8, 2007.
 
 

1915 births
2007 deaths
American choreographers
Tony Award winners
African-American male dancers
African-American dancers
American male dancers
American tap dancers
20th-century American dancers
20th-century African-American people
21st-century African-American people